Area 2 is a division of the Nevada Test Site in the Mojave Desert. The area is located 18 miles south-west of Area 51.

Area 2 was the site of 144 tests comprising 169 detonations. Shot "Gabbs" a detonation test, was intended for early 1993 but was cancelled in 1992 due to a pre-emptive stop of testing based arount the Comprehensive Nuclear-Test-Ban Treaty.

Gallery

References

Area 02